The Parker 2 Fire was a wildfire in the Modoc National Forest in Modoc County, California in the United States. It was fully contained by August 28. The cause for the fire was lightning.

Events

The Parker 2 Fire was first reported on August 3 at 2:00 pm. The fire was started by lightning and was fueled by grass, brush and timber. As a result, the Parker Creek area of the Warner Mountains was closed.

Impact

The Middle Fork Parker Creek Bridge was damaged by the fire. A temporary, portable bridge was provided by the Shasta-Trinity National Forest until a permanent solution is finalized.

References

2017 California wildfires
History of Modoc County, California
Wildfires in Modoc County, California